Leontine Sagan (born Leontine Schlesinger; 13 February 1889 – 20 May 1974) was an Austrian-Hungarian theatre director and actress of Jewish descent. She is best known for directing Mädchen in Uniform (1931).

Along with directing for both cinema and the stage, Sagan also acted in several films. She died in Pretoria, South Africa in 1974, at the age of 85.

Personal life
Born in either Budapest or Vienna in 1889, Sagan trained with Max Reinhardt, who is best known for his elaborate and imaginative sets and theatrics. In 1899, as a child, she moved to South Africa with her family just before the Second Boer War. She was educated in a German-language school in Johannesburg. In her later years, Sagan married publisher and writer Dr. Victor Fleischer; the union was childless.

Career
Sagan directed three films.  She is best remembered for the first of two films she directed, Mädchen in Uniform (1931). It has an all-female cast and was ground-breaking not only for its portrayal of lesbian and pedagogical eros, but also for the production's co-operative and profit-sharing financial arrangements. Whether Sagan herself was a lesbian is unknown; the book Women Film Directors lists her as "lesbian film director" as she directed Christa Winsloe's play, said to contain lesbian themes.

In her teenage years, she worked as a stage actress in Germany and Austria. Some films that Sagan appeared in include The Holy Mountain (1926), The Great Leap (1927), The White Ecstasy (1930), and Die Nacht der Regisseure (1994). It was not until 1931, when Sagan became involved behind the scenes, that she gained international attention after directing her most significant film Mädchen in Uniform.

Following the debut of this film, Sagan moved to England. In England, she directed Men of Tomorrow and worked for the film director Alexander Korda at Korda’s Studios. She later worked as a theatre producer in Manchester. She was also the first female producer at London's Drury Lane, where she successfully presided over a series of Ivor Novello's musicals in the West End: Glamorous Night (1935), Careless Rapture (1936), Crest of the Wave (1937), The Dancing Years (1939) and Arc de Triomphe (1943). The popularity of these shows is credited with saving Drury Lane from potential closure in the 1930s. Towards the end of her career, Sagan moved to South Africa and became an influential director in South African theatre, and co-founded the National Theatre in Johannesburg. In February 1948 she directed the NTO's first English production Dear Brutus by J.M. Barrie, followed by An Inspector Calls. Directed In Theatre Street for the East Rand Theatre Club in 1950. (Leontine Sagan - ESAT. N.p., n.d. Web. 12 Dec. 2016.)

Filmography
*Mädchen in Uniform (1931)
Sagan’s most significant film featured an all-female cast. It was the first film in Germany to be produced cooperatively (both the crew and cast obtained shares rather than a salary). Mädchen in Uniform is based on the play by Christa Winsloe. It survived but was much censored until the 1970s. Eleanor Roosevelt is credited with helping to revoke its censorship in the US. It was released in its surviving form on video-tape, with English subtitles, in the US in 1994 and in the UK in 2000. The film centers on an all-girls boarding school. It examines various emotional and physical pressures caused by the authoritarian rule and militarism of the Prussian headmistress. It is thought to be an anti-fascist film that critiques the Prussian education system. Many critics also argue that the film is suggesting of feminist notions, since the women characters openly express their emotions and sexual orientations. 

The film is among the first to suggest lesbian themes. Throughout Mädchen in Uniform, girls are depicted holding hands, shown dressing and undressing, and in one scene two women are depicted kissing on the lips.The film’s main character Manuela, a 14-year-old girl, develops a crush on her teacher Fräulein von Bernburg, which affects her performance in her class and in the school's theatre production. Manuela eventually has a public and drunken breakdown in which she confesses her love for Fräulein von Bernburg, after which she is sanctioned by the headmistress, but supported by her fellow students. The headmistress forbids Fräulein von Bernburg to see or speak to Manuela again. Manuela nearly kills herself but is found and saved. The film was banned by the Nazis as 'decadent', but it has left a significant mark on history for its female imagery and anti-militaristic themes. This film was influential at women’s film festivals in the 1970s.

Books
Lights and Shadows: The autobiography of Leontine Sagan, Johannesburg 1996
Michael Eckardt (ed.): Leontine Sagan. Licht und Schatten. Schauspielerin und Regisseurin auf vier Kontinenten. Hentrich & Hentrich, Berlin 2010, .

See also
 List of female film and television directors
 List of LGBT-related films directed by women

Notes

References
Acker, A. (1991). Reel women: Pioneers of the cinema, 1896 to the present (pp. 320–322). New York: Continuum.
Bernard Sachs. South African Personalities and Places. Kayor Publishers, Johannesburg, 1959. Excerpt
Foster, Gwendolyn Audrey (1995), Women Film Directors: An International Bio-Critical Dictionary, Greenwood Press, p. 322, .
Foster, G. (1998). Women filmmakers & their films (pp. 361–362). Detroit: St. James Press.
 lespress.de "vermutlich lesbische Regisseurin" (Eng.: "possibly lesbian director")
Mädchen in Uniform. (n.d.). Retrieved May 2, 2015, from http://www.filmreference.com/Films-Le-Ma/M-dchen-in-Uniform.html

External links
 
 Literature on Leontine Sagan

1889 births
1974 deaths
20th-century Austrian actresses
Austrian film directors
Austrian people of Jewish descent
Austrian theatre directors
Austrian women film directors
German-language film directors
20th-century Hungarian actresses
Hungarian film directors
Hungarian people of Jewish descent
Hungarian theatre directors
Actresses from Budapest
Hungarian film actresses
Austrian film actresses
Austrian stage actresses